Panikondanviduthy is a village in the Orathanadu taluk of Thanjavur district, Tamil Nadu, India.

Demographics 

As per the 2001 census, Panikondanviduthy had a total population of 1954 with 972 males and 982 females. The sex ratio was 1010. The literacy rate was 64.5.

References 

 

Villages in Thanjavur district